David Harsanyi (born circa 1970) is an American conservative journalist, columnist, author, and editor. He wrote for the Denver Post for eight years, then Blaze, and then he edited for The Federalist for more than six years. He became a senior writer at National Review, and has returned to The Federalist as a senior editor. He is the author of five books.

Personal life
Harsanyi was born in New York City in about 1970. His parents were Jews who emigrated from Hungary to Rome in 1969, then to New York. His father had trained as a chemist in Hungary, but without English skills he found work in New York as a diamond setter; his mother took business courses and became an accountant. Harsanyi is the eldest of three brothers.

Career 
In his early career, Harsanyi worked as a sports-journalist, covering baseball for Sports Illustrated and the Associated Press. He has also written columns for "The Wall Street Journal, Reason, National Review, The Weekly Standard, The Christian Science Monitor, The Jerusalem Post, The Globe and Mail, The Hill", and he "worked for more than a decade as an editor, reporter and producer at media outlets such as the Associated Press, (and) the New York Daily News". He was hired as a press secretary for the Republican Jewish Coalition prior to writing a column for eight years at The Denver Post. Harsanyi was hired by Blaze Media and then was a senior editor at the online publication, The Federalist, writing more than 800 columns. He became a senior writer at National Review in 2019. He left National Review in May 2022 to return to writing for The Federalist.

As of 2022, Harsanyi has appeared nine times on C-SPAN.

Critical response
When Harsanyi began writing columns for the Denver Post, he was the subject of angry threats from readers. One reader threatened to take Harsanyi's head off and mount it on his wall. According to Michael Roberts of Westword, "Taxidermic threats are new for Harsanyi, whose pre-Post columns generally ran in publications that tilted to the right. 'When I was writing for the National Review, I had solely conservatives reading me,' he says, 'so I didn't get any nasty letters.' At the Post, however, he's been positively bombarded with negative missives during his first few weeks on the job, with many correspondents making sweeping generalizations about him based on perceptions of his politics." Roberts said, "Then again, Denver-area readers have had little recent experience with local columnists on the conservative side of the continuum."

Of Harsanyi's first book, The Nanny State, the Federalist Society said, "Harsanyi argues that when the government intervenes in this overzealous manner, no matter how good the intentions may appear to be, it not only diminishes our ability to make our own choices, but it promotes a culture of dependence that goes against the freedoms we celebrate so earnestly." 

Publishers Weekly's review said "the book would have benefited from more anecdotes and original reporting, instead of incessantly naming overzealous do-gooders. Moreover, Harsanyi barely considers business's role, as these dangerous do-gooders fight fast food and tobacco companies armed with hundreds of millions of marketing dollars. There's not much new, but fellow libertarians may enjoy getting carried away by the flood of Harsanyi's outrage."

Jeff Minnick wrote of The People Have Spoken,

Of First Freedom: A Ride Through America's Enduring History with the Gun, Duke University's Michael C. Munger wrote, "It is not a legalistic argument about the importance of the Second Amendment, but rather a description of the place of guns in American history and culture." 

According to David French, First Freedom "simultaneously serves as a technical, legal, and cultural history — an ambitious effort that could easily bog down in any given American period. But Harsanyi smartly balances detail and overview."

Introducing an interview with Harsanyi about First Freedom, Bob Zadek wrote, "Today there are more guns than people in the U.S. — by a lot — thanks in large part to progressives' efforts to restrict our Second Amendment rights... David Harsanyi relays these counter-intuitively findings in his new book".

The New York Times wrote that Harsanyi's opinions are among "differing perspectives worth your time".

Selected publications

Books

Articles

See also

 Conservatism in the United States
 Libertarianism in the United States
 New Yorkers in journalism
 Partisan (politics)

References

External links

 
Author David Harsanyi: Nanny State Colorado Public Radio (audio, 11:14)
 (video, 1:36:05
Bob Zadek interviews David Harsanyi (audio, 51:41)

20th-century American journalists

20th-century American male writers
21st-century American journalists
21st-century American male writers
American atheist writers
American columnists
American male journalists
American male non-fiction writers
American political commentators
American political writers
American online publication editors
American people of Hungarian-Jewish descent
American print editors
Blaze Media people
HuffPost writers and columnists
Jewish American journalists
Jewish American writers
Jewish American atheists
Living people
Male journalists
National Review people
The Denver Post people
Year of birth missing (living people)